Fenxi County is a county of Shanxi province, China. It is under the administration of Linfen city.

Toponymy 
Fenxi literally means west of the Fen River, due to the county's location along the western banks of the Fen River.

History 
According to the Yuanhe Maps and Records of Prefectures and Counties, the area of present-day Fenxi County was once known as Yicheng.

The Western Han organized the area as Zhi County, which the Eastern Han changed to Yong'an County.

The Northern Wei reorganized the area was Fenxi Commandery.

Under the Ming dynasty and the Qing dynasty, the area was administered again under Pingyang Fu.

People's Republic of China 
The current iteration of Fenxi County was established in 1961.

Geography 
Fenxi County is located along the west bank of the Fen River, and along the southeastern portion of the Lüliang Mountains.

Major rivers in Fenxi County include the Fen River, the Tuanbaijian River, and the Duizhu River.

Climate

Administrative divisions 
Fenxi County administers 5 towns and 3 townships.

Towns 

Townships 

Demographics 
Fenxi County has a sex ratio of 108.15 males per 100 females.

As of 2019, 71,924 people in Fenxi County, or 47.78% of the population, lived in urban areas; 78,598 people, or 52.22% of the population, lived in rural areas. The county's most populous village-level division, as of 2019, is Xiatuanbai, with a population of 3,360; the county's least populous village-level division is Goudi, with a population of 320.

The population of 150,522 reported in 2019 is up from the 144,791 reported in the 2010 Chinese Census. In the 2000 Chinese Census, Fenxi County's population was 133,836. A 1996 estimate put the county's population at about 120,000.

See also
 Linfen

References

County-level divisions of Shanxi
Linfen